Sivori is an Italian surname. Notable people with the surname include:

Camillo Sivori, Italian virtuoso violinist and composer
Eduardo Sívori, Argentine artist widely regarded as his country's first realist painter
Francesco Sivori (1771–1830), Italian admiral of the Kingdom of Sardinia
Omar Sívori, Italian Argentine football striker and manager
Regina María Sívori, mother of Pope Francis
Arturo Igoroin Sanjurjo, known as Sívori, Spanish footballer

Italian-language surnames
it:Sivori